Kianga is a rural locality in the Shire of Banana, Queensland, Australia.

History 
The locality takes its name from the former railway station, named on 23 December 1937 by Queensland Railways Department after a pastoral run. It is an Aboriginal word, meaning home.

References 

Shire of Banana
Localities in Queensland